Jan Maarschalk Lemmens, professionally known as Glints, is a Flemish musician. Born in Antwerp, he released his first single "Dread" in 2014, with the self-titled début EP Glints following a year later.

In 2018, Glints released the single "Bugatti", the lead single off an as of now untitled first album. The song marked a shift away from his prior indie pop sound into more grime-influenced material, and became a minor hit in Belgium. Glints has also collaborated with electronic duo  on several occasions, most notoriously on their single "New Flow".

Glints has played sets at several major music festivals, notably at Pukkelpop in 2017.

Members 

 Jan Maarschalk Lemmens – vocals, songwriting

Band members

Current 
 Jergan Callebaut – production, keyboards
 Mathias Bervoets – guitar
 Tim Caramin – drums

Former 
 Ferre Marnef – bass

Discography 
 Glints (2015)
 Burgundy (2017)
 Choirboy (2020)

References 

1993 births
Living people
Belgian rappers
Belgian people of English descent
English-language singers from Belgium
Musicians from Antwerp